This is a list of National Collegiate Athletic Association (NCAA) women's lacrosse head coaches by number of career wins. Head coaches with a combined career record of at least 250 wins at the Division I, Division II, Division III, or historically equivalent level are included here.

Coaches
Statistics current as of the end of the 2020 season.

References

 
Lacrosse, Women
Coaches
Lacrosse